Puss moth  may refer to:

 Megalopyge opercularis, a North American moth
 Cerura vinula, a European moth
 de Havilland Puss Moth, an aeroplane built between 1929 and 1933

Animal common name disambiguation pages